Southern Sermilik is a fjord in southwestern Greenland. Administratively it is part of the Kujalleq municipality.

Geography
The fjord is oriented in a roughly NE/SW direction, to the southwest the Southern Sermilik Fjord opens into the Labrador Sea of the North Atlantic Ocean.

The islands of Amitsok and Angmalortoq —the latter rising to a height of 1,253 m— lie at the mouth of the fjord. There are further islands beyond them, Sermersooq Island being the largest.

The Sermeq Glacier at the inland end of this fjord has been undergoing a well documented recession in recent history. A similar retreat of the glacier at the fjord's head has been documented in neighbouring Tasermiut Fjord as well.

Bibliography
Ivar Haug (2005). Gazetteer of Greenland UBiT (Trondheim University Library),

See also
List of fjords of Greenland

References

External links
 Pictures of Southern Sermilik and Tasermiut
 Pictures of Southern Sermilik

Fjords of Greenland